Irena Sonia Bačiulytė (later Vaitkevičienė, born 8 January 1939) is a retired Lithuanian rower who won three European titles in the eights event in 1963, 1965 and 1967; she finished second in 1964 and 1966. In 1962 Bačiulytė graduated from the Lithuanian University of Educational Sciences and later worked as a rowing coach in Vilnus. Her husband Ričardas Vaitkevičius was also an international rower and rowing coach.

References

1939 births
Living people
Lithuanian female rowers
Soviet female rowers
European Rowing Championships medalists
Lithuanian University of Educational Sciences alumni